Events in the year 1840 in Belgium.

Incumbents
Monarch: Leopold I
Prime Minister: Barthélémy de Theux de Meylandt (to 18 April); Joseph Lebeau (from 18 April)

Events
 29 March – Treaty of amity and navigation with the United States signed but never ratified.
 18 April – Liberal ministry under Joseph Lebeau comes to power.
 25 May – Provincial elections
 30 May – Parliament considers petitions for Dutch to be made an official language, organised by Ferdinand Augustijn Snellaert and Jean-Baptist David.
 4 June – Botanical Garden of Mechelen opens, with Joseph Van Hoorde as head gardener.
 10 August – Culmination of the Fortsas hoax in Binche.
 15 August – City of Antwerp festively marks the bicentenary of the death of Peter Paul Rubens.

Publications
Periodicals
Almanach royal de Belgique (Brussels, Librairie Polytechnique)
Annuaire de la bibliothèque royale de Belgique
Annuaire dramatique de la Belgique, 2
Archives de la médecine belge
Messager des sciences historiques
Pasinomie: Collection complète des lois, décrets, arrêtés et règlements généraux qui peuvent être invoqués en Belgique, series 2, 1822-1824 (Brussels, Société Typographique Belge)
La renaissance: Chronique des arts et de la littérature begins publication under the auspices of the Association Nationale pour Favoriser les Arts en Belgique.
Revue de Bruxelles, 4
Revue nationale de Belgique

Exhibitions
 Exposition publique de la Société royale d'agriculture et de botanique à Gand (Ghent, D. J. Vanderhaeghen-Hulin)

Guidebooks and directories
 Indicateur belge, ou Guide commercial et industriel  (Brussels, Bauchard-Rinche)
Alexandre Ferrier de Tourettes, Belgium Historical and Picturesque, translated by Henry Robert Addison (Brussels)
Alexandre Ferrier de Tourettes, Handbook for Travellers on the Belgian Rail-Road (Brussels)

Monographs
P. Namur, Histoire des bibliothèques publiques de la Belgique (Brussels, F. Parent)

Literature
 Maria Doolaeghe, Madelieven
 Jules de Saint-Genois, Le Faux Baudouin

Births
3 January – Father Damien, missionary (died 1889)
11 April – Paul Janson, politician (died 1913)
7 June – Charlotte of Belgium, Empress of Mexico (died 1927)
11 June – Henri de Braekeleer, painter (died 1888)

Deaths
4 February – Angélique de Rouillé (born 1756), writer
20 March – Jan Frans van Dael (born 1764), painter 
9 June – John Cockerill (born 1790), industrialist
  – Jeanne-Marie Artois (born 1762), brewer

References

 
1840s in Belgium